William, Willie, Will or Bill Simms may refer to:

William Simms (instrument maker) (1793–1860), British astronomical instrument maker
William E. Simms (1822–1898), American politician
William Gilmore Simms (1806–1870), American writer and historian
William Knox Simms (1830–1897), Australian businessman and politician
Willie Simms (1870–1927), American jockey
Will Simms II, Survivor contestant
Bill Simms (1908–2002), American baseball player

See also
William Sims (disambiguation)